The Timercea is a left tributary of the river Cigher in Romania. It flows into the Cigher near Tauț.

References

Rivers of Romania
Rivers of Arad County